Abu Jafar Muhammad ibn Husayn Khazin (900–971), also called Al-Khazin, was an Iranian Muslim astronomer and mathematician from Khorasan. He worked on both astronomy and number theory.

Al-Khazin was one of the scientists brought to the court in Ray, Iran by the ruler of the Buyid dynasty, Adhad ad-Dowleh, who ruled from 949 to 983. In 959/960, Khazin was required by the vizier of Ray, who was appointed by ad-Dowleh, to measure the obliquity of the ecliptic.

One of Al-Khazin's works  ("Tables of the Disks of the Astrolabe") was described by his successors as the best work in the field and they make many references to it. The work describes some astronomical instruments, in particular an astrolabe fitted with plates inscribed with tables, and a commentary on the use of these.  A copy of this instrument was made, but it vanished in Germany during World War II.  A photograph of this copy was taken and examined by the historian David King in 1980.

Al-Khazin also wrote a commentary on the Roman polymath Ptolemy's Almagest in which he gives 19 propositions relating to statements by Ptolemy, and proposed a different model of the cosmos.

References

Sources

Further reading
  (PDF version)
 
 

900 births
971 deaths
10th-century Iranian mathematicians
10th-century Iranian astronomers
Astronomers of the medieval Islamic world
Scholars under the Buyid dynasty